The United States federal state and local tax (SALT) deduction is an itemized deduction that allows taxpayers to deduct certain taxes paid to state and local governments from their adjusted gross income. The Tax Cuts and Jobs Act of 2017 put a $10,000 cap on the SALT deduction for the years 2018–2025.

The SALT deduction reduces the cost of state and local taxes to taxpayers. It disproportionately benefits wealthy and high-earning taxpayers in areas with comparatively high state and local taxes. The Tax Policy Center estimated in 2016 that fully eliminating the SALT deduction would increase federal revenue by nearly $1.3 trillion over 10 years.

Definition
For United States Federal Income Tax purposes, state and local taxes are defined in section 170(a) of the Internal Revenue Code as taxes paid to states and localities in the forms of: (i) real property taxes; (ii) personal property taxes; (iii) income, war profits, and excess profits taxes; and (iv) general sales taxes. The Tax Cuts and Jobs Act of 2017 capped the use of this itemized deduction at $10,000 ($5,000 for married persons who file separately).

Effects
Tax savings from the SALT deduction flow disproportionately to those with high incomes. According to the Joint Committee on Taxation, in 2014 88% of the benefit of the SALT deduction accrued to those with incomes above $100,000 and only 1% accrued to those making less than $50,000.

The SALT deduction primarily benefits those in high-tax states, which tend to be those with consistent Democratic legislative majorities. In 2016, the ten counties with the largest SALT deductions per filer (on average) were in New York, California, Connecticut and New Jersey. These ten counties are in the New York metropolitan area and San Francisco Bay Area, which have high concentrations of wealth and expensive real estate. Since the deduction was capped at $10,000 in 2017, many homeowners have been unable to deduct thousands of dollars that they previously could, beyond what they pay in property taxes, to state, county and local governments in these places.

In 2017, only taxpayers in New York, Massachusetts, Connecticut, and New Jersey (the states with the first, second, third, and ninth highest GDP per capita) on average sent more than $1,000 each to the federal government above what the state received per capita. Capping the SALT deduction tends to increase this balance of payments deficit.

Economic modeling by the economists Gilbert E. Metcalf and Martin Feldstein suggests that eliminating the SALT deduction would have "little if any impact on state and local spending". The economist Edward Gramlich has likewise concluded that eliminating the deduction would have little effect on state and local spending; he also finds that eliminating the deduction would likely not induce many high-income taxpayers to leave low-income communities.

History

Precursor
A deduction on state and local taxes predates the establishment of the permanent federal income tax instituted by the Revenue Act of 1913. To help fund the Civil War effort, President Abraham Lincoln signed the Revenue Act of 1862, which established a temporary income tax. The Revenue Act included a deduction for state and local taxes, as well as national taxes.

This Civil War-era income tax was repealed in 1871. A federal income tax was again introduced in 1894, and again included deductions for state and local taxes, but in 1895 the Supreme Court ruled the income tax unconstitutional in Pollock v. Farmers' Loan & Trust Co.

Creation: Revenue Act of 1913
The first permanent income tax was established by the Revenue Act of 1913, after the ratification of the Sixteenth Amendment to the United States Constitution earlier that year. A deduction for state and local taxes, as well as for national taxes, was included in the Revenue Act. The federal income tax has included a deduction for state and local taxes ever since.

Various changes 
During the Great Depression, states expanded the number of taxes they levied to make up for revenue shortfalls. This included an expansion in state income taxes (before 1930, only 14 states and Hawaii had state income taxes, which were imposed primarily on very high incomes at low rates) and state sales taxes (by 1940, sales taxes made up about 60% of state budgets). In response to the growing use of state sales taxes, in 1942 Congress made an explicit allowance for a deduction of state and local retail sales taxes.

The introduction of the standard deduction in 1944 limited the scope of the state and local tax deduction, as well as all other itemized deductions (taxpayers who choose to use the standard deduction may not use itemized deductions).

On a number of occasions, Congress has restricted the types of state and local taxes that can be used with the SALT deduction. The Revenue Act of 1964 restricted the SALT deduction to state and local taxes on real property, personal property, income, general sales, and gasoline and other motor fuels. Amid the 1970s energy crisis, Congress passed the Revenue Act of 1978, which eliminated the deduction for state and local taxes on gasoline and motor vehicle fuel. The Tax Reform Act of 1986 disallowed sales taxes from being deducted, while the American Jobs Creation Act of 2004 gave taxpayers the option of deducting either state and local income taxes or state and local sales taxes.

Tax Cuts and Jobs Act of 2017

The Tax Cuts and Jobs Act of 2017, signed into law by President Donald Trump, capped the total SALT deduction at $10,000 for the tax years 2018 through 2025. The bill also increased the standard deduction, which significantly reduced the number of taxpayers who claim the SALT deduction. As a result of the bill, the cost of the SALT deduction decreased from $104 billion in 2017 to $10.4 billion in 2019.

In January 2018, the states of New York, New Jersey and Connecticut (whose wealthy residents benefit disproportionately from the SALT deduction) sued the federal government over the constitutionality of the SALT cap, arguing that it unfairly restricts their ability to pursue their own preferred tax policies. In October 2019, a federal court dismissed the suit; appeal was declined by the Supreme Court on April 18, 2022.

Build Back Better Act

In July 2021, House Representative Tom Suozzi and Senate majority leader Chuck Schumer, both Democrats from New York, pushed legislation in the U.S. House of Representatives to repeal the deduction limit. In April 2021, as the Build Back Better Act was being debated in the House, a bipartisan group of House lawmakers formed the "SALT caucus" to advocate for the repeal of the $10,000 limit on the state and local tax deduction. They later threatened to block the bill if a raise on the SALT deduction was not included.

Ultimately, the version of the Build Back Better Act that the House passed on November 19, 2021, would have increased the SALT deduction cap to $80,000 until 2030, after which the increase would expire. Jared Golden was the only Democrat to vote against the act, because of his opposition to benefiting high-income taxpayers by raising the cap. The Build Back Better Act stalled in the Senate.

The Tax Policy Center concluded that more than 96% of the tax cut from raising the deduction cap to $80,000 would go to the highest-income 20% of households.

Support 
Advocates of the SALT deduction argue that it "helps state and local governments fund public services" because "higher-income filers are more willing to support state and local taxes" if they can deduct them from their federal tax liability. For instance, former Governor of New York Andrew Cuomo contended in 2017 that "New York would be destroyed" if the deduction were substantially reduced. But several studies have concluded that the effect of eliminating the deduction on state and local spending would be small.

Advocates also argue that, while the benefit flows disproportionately to high-income taxpayers, it also provides tax relief to some middle-class taxpayers.

Criticism
Detractors of the SALT deduction, both on the political left and right, often point out that the deduction primarily benefits high earners: according to the Tax Policy Center, the top 20% of taxpayers by income would receive 96% of the benefit of repealing the SALT cap. Some critics also contend that the deduction in effect results in low-tax states and cities subsidizing the federal tax payments of high-tax states and cities, though this is a contentious argument.

Some conservative critics of the deduction argue that it encourages "wasteful spending" by state governments because it "insulates governments from negative consequences when they spend taxpayer dollars inefficiently".

Notes

References

Taxation in the United States
Personal taxes in the United States